Speziale may refer to:

People
 Charles Speziale (1948 – 1999), American Aerospace engineer
 Jerry Speziale, American law enforcement officer
 Marie Speziale, American musician

Artistic works
 Lo speziale, an opera buffa by Joseph Haydn

Places
 Speziale, a village in Italy